Stadionul Minerul is a multi-purpose stadium in Ștei, Romania. It is currently used mostly for football matches, is the home ground of CSO Ștei and holds 800 people. The stadium was opened in 1954, being built by the Soviets during the town construction and was the home ground of Minerul Ștei until 2008, when the club was dissolved.

In 2015 the Town of Ștei started the procedure to get in the administration of the stadium, owned by the Uranium National Company.

References

Football venues in Romania
Sport in Bihor County
Buildings and structures in Bihor County